Baldwin Park is a Metrolink train station in Baldwin Park, California, United States, between Pacific Avenue and Ramona Boulevard next to Baldwin Park City Hall.

The station is owned by the City of Baldwin Park. Foothill Transit and Los Angeles Metro Bus routes serve the station, and Baldwin Park and West Covina provide municipal shuttles to the station.

Station artwork 
Danza Indigenas is outdoor artwork at the station by Chicana artist Judy Baca which includes a concrete footpath that represents ceremonial steps performed by early California inhabitants, the Gabrielino and Chumash Indians. The monument bears several engraved statements whose origins are not attributed. In mid-2005, "Save Our State", an anti-illegal immigration group based in Ventura County, launched a series of protests over  an inscriptionIt was better before they came that Save Our State claimed was directed against whites. According to Baca, that sentence was uttered by a white Baldwin Park politician in the 1950s; he was lamenting the influx of persons of Mexican ancestry into the San Gabriel Valley following World War II. The protests drew counter-protesters, and required city expenditure on crowd control and riot police, an admitted goal of Save Our State.

References

External links 
 
 Danza Indigenas at the Los Angeles Metro website
 Danza Indigenas at the Judy Baca artist website

Metrolink stations in Los Angeles County, California
Railway stations in the United States opened in 1993